KVLR (92.5 FM) is a radio station licensed to Sunset Valley, Texas (Austin, Texas) and is owned by Educational Media Foundation.  It is the Austin affiliate for EMF's Air 1 radio, airing a Christian Worship format.  The station also has two translators at 92.1 FM Austin and 92.9 FM Del Valle.

History
The station started in the early '90s as KKLB ("Club 92") with a contemporary Spanish format. In the early 2000s, KKLB switched to Spanish Oldies as La Lupe 92.5 FM, but kept the KKLB calls.

On February 23, 2007, the call letters were changed from KKLB to KXXS as part of a format switch to Spanish pop-formatted "Digital 92.5". "La Lupe" moved to AM 1560 KXTZ.

Digital 92.5 lasted until November 2, 2009 when the format changed formats to sports, simulcasting KTTX 104.9 FM.

On November 30, 2009, KXXS split from the KTTX simulcast and changed formats to oldies, with programming from Scott Shannon's True Oldies Channel.

On August 15, 2011, KXXS began simulcasting on 98.9 FM, KXBT. On September 3, 2011, the True Oldies format ceased operations on KXXS, making its permanent home on KXBT. KXXS switched to Spanish sports as an ESPN Deportes Radio affiliate.

KXXS was Austin's third sports station on the FM dial, along with KTXX and KVET.

On July 2, 2012, the station again changed its call sign, this time to KVLR and changed to EMF's K-LOVE contemporary Christian format as a result of a sale to Educational Media Foundation. The sale to EMF was consummated on October 17, 2012 at a purchase price of $750,000.  KVLR also broadcasts EMF's Air 1 radio, a Christian Worship format on its HD2 subchannel.

On November 1, 2020, EMF switched the K-Love satellite format to newly acquired KFMK (105.9 FM) and moved Air 1 to its primary channel.

References

External links
Digital 92.5 gets a simulcast on 104.9
La Lupe Goes Digital

VLR
Radio stations established in 1992
Air1 radio stations
1992 establishments in Texas
Educational Media Foundation radio stations
VLR